Stephen or Steven Williams may refer to:

Arts and entertainment 
 Stephen Williams (director), Canadian film and television director
 Stephen Williams (musician), double-bass player associated with the Michael Nyman Band
 Stephen Williams (The Real World)
 Stephen Williams (Radio Luxembourg) (1908–1994), British radio announcer
 Stephen Williams (writer)
 Steven Williams (born 1949), actor
 Stephen Williams (fashion designer) (born 1964), celebrity fashion designer
 Stephen W. Williams (1837–1899), British civil engineer and architect
 Stevie Stone (Stephen Williams, born 1981), American rapper
 Stephen Tyrone Williams (born 1982), American actor
 Steven A. Williams (born 1965), musician, composer, record producer and engineer 
 Steven Jay Williams (born 1974), American YouTube personality known as Boogie2988

Sports 
 Stephen Williams (cricketer, born 1954), former Gloucestershire cricketer
 Stephen Williams (cricketer, born 1967), former Cornwall cricketer
 Stephen Williams (figure skater), British ice dancer
 Stephen Williams (footballer) (born 1961), former Australian Rules Football player and coach
 Stephen Williams (wide receiver) (born 1986), American football wide receiver
 Stephen Williams (cyclist) (born 1996), British cyclist
 Steven Williams (snowboarder) (born 1988), Argentine snowboarder
 Stephen Williams (bowler) (born 1973), Welsh bowls player
 Steven Williams, known as Stone Cold Steve Austin (born 1964), professional wrestler

Government 
 Stephen Williams (British politician) (born 1966), British MP for Bristol West
 Stephen F. Williams (1936-2020), United States federal judge
 Stephen K. Williams (1819–1916), New York lawyer and politician
 Stephen T. Williams, mayor of Huntington, West Virginia

Other 
 Stephen Williams (archaeologist) (1926–2017), archaeologist at Harvard University
 Steven R. Williams, convicted murderer; see John McDonogh High School shooting
 Steven Williams (executive), American businessman
 Stephen Williams (murder victim), lynched in Upper Marlboro Maryland on October 20, 1894
 Stephen Williams (minister) (1694–1782), Congregational minister
 Stephen N. Williams (born 1959), theologian

See also
 Steve Williams (disambiguation)
 Stephon Williams (born 1993), American ice hockey goaltender